The Francis Hotel is a four star hotel located in a Grade 1 listed building on the south side of Queen Square, Bath, Somerset, England. It was part of Accor's MGallery luxury boutique hotel collection. On 1st April 2022, the Francis Hotel left the Accor chain.

Background

The Francis Hotel occupies seven of the nine town houses built between 1728 and 1736, on the south side of Queen Square.

In the Georgian period, John Wood set out to restore Bath to what he believed was its former ancient glory as one of the most important and significant cities in England. In 1725 he developed an ambitious plan for his home town, which due to opposition he developed outside the existing city walls. Wood created a distinctive image for the city, one that has greatly contributed to Bath’s continuing popularity.

Queen Square is a key component of his vision, and was intended to appear like a palace with wings and a forecourt to be viewed from the south side. Named in honour of Queen Caroline, wife of George II, located away from the crowded streets of medieval Bath, but only a short walk to the Abbey, Pump Room, Assembly Rooms and baths, although outside the city walls Queen Square quickly became a popular residence for Bath's Georgian society.

Wood himself chose to live at No.9, on the south side with the best view of the structure imaginable, until he died. No.9 is now the entrance to the Francis Hotel.

Hotel
The nine townhouses that make up the south side of Queen Square remained as individual dwellings until the late the nineteenth century.

In 1858, local builder Soloman Francis established a boarding house at No. 10 Queen Square. During the 1870s, his widow, Emily, started to buy up the adjacent properties and, by 1884 had expanded the business into Nos 6-9 and 11. In May 1884, the seven Georgian town houses were opened as the Francis Private Hotel.

In April 1942 during World War II,  of the hotel frontage was lost when a  Nazi Luftwaffe high explosive bomb landed on the east side of the square during the Bath Blitz. Casualties were low considering the devastation, with the majority of the guests and staff having taken shelter in the hotel basement.

J. Hopwood rebuilt the hotel in 1952-53, while The Beatles stayed in the hotel in 1963.

Present
Between 2010 and 2012 the Francis Hotel was refurbished by Accor Hotels. The corridors were split into different areas by cross-corridor doors, with these subdivisions roughly marking the boundaries of the different houses. The new interior decoration marks these diversions through the use of different wallpaper in heritage colours and patterns. Blue plaques explain who was in residence at specific dates.

The Francis Hotel, which features chef Raymond Blanc’s Brasserie Blanc, presently has 98 bedrooms of three different types: Classic, Superior and Feature. The Francis is part of Accor Group's MGallery, launched in September 2008, with 50 hotels over five continents.

In March 2023, a 19-year-old man was arrested on suspicion of drink-driving after a car became wedged against the basement windows of the Francis Hotel.

References

External links
Francis Hotel

Hotels in Somerset
Grade I listed buildings in Bath, Somerset
Accor hotels
Hotel buildings completed in 1858
Grade I listed hotels